Fraus griseomaculata is a moth of the family Hepialidae. It is endemic to Victoria.

References

Moths described in 1989
Hepialidae